This fossil flora in Turkey stems from at least six Pliocene deposits in Güvem and Beşkonak villages,  north of Ankara,  north of Kızılcahamam and  south of the Black Sea coast. Between six and seven million years ago, a fresh water lake existed there in a forested area with mostly broad leaved deciduous tree species, dominated by sequoia and oak.

The Turkish botany professor Baki Kasaplıgil (1918-1992) from Çankırı who was professor at the Biology Department, Mills College, Oakland, California from 1956 to 1992, made fossil collecting trips to the area around  Kızılcahamam - Çerkeş road in 1964 and 1968. In the 1964 trip he collected fossil leaves of Glyptostrobus, Sequoia, Zelkova, Fagus, Carpinus, Ulmus, Quercus, Tilia and Acer. In the 1968 trip, he collected 400 plant parts such as leaves, seeds, fruits, twigs and branches. He also collected 50 fossils of frog and fish skeletons and larvae and insects.
In 1969, Dr. Wayne Fry from University of Berkeley made plant fossil collections in Güvem. Prof. Daniel I. Axelrod also assisted in the research of this flora.

Images of the fossil plants and fossil sites

Fossil plant species so far described from the deposits

Pteridophyta 

Salviniaceae

Salvinia sp.

Pteridaceae

Cryptogramma aff. crispo

Gymnosperms 

†Glyptostrobus europaeus

Pinus canariensis

Pinus morrisonicola

†Sequoia langsdorfi

Tsuga sp.

Ephedra sp.

Angiosperms, dicots 

Cercidiphyllaceae

†Cercidiphyllum crenatum

Magnoliaceae

Magnolia sprengeri

Menispermaceae

Menispermum sp.

Lauraceae

Persea indica

Platanaceae

Platanus sp.

Juglandaceae

†Platycarya miocenica

Pterocarya fraxinifolia

Salicaceae

Salix sp.

Populus tremula

Myricaceae

Comptonia sp.

Myrica banksiaefolia

Fagaceae

Castanea sp.

Castanopsis sp.

Fagus sp.

†Quercus drymeja
†Quercus heidingeri
†Quercus kubinyi
†Quercus aff. lonchitis
Quercus petroela aff.
Quercus sclerophyllina
Quercus semecarpifolia 
†Quercus seyfriedii (very similar to Quercus phellos from eastern and central United States)
†Quercus sosnoisky 
Quercus hartwissiana
Quercus trojana;aff.

Betulaceae

Alnus sp.

Betula luminifera aff.

Carpinus miocenica

Sapindaceae

†Acer angustilobum
†Acer tribolatum

Anacardiaceae

Astronium sp.

Ebenaceae

Diospyros aff. miokaki

Aquifoliaceae

Ilex gracilis (close to Ilex serrata)

Rosaceae 
Sorbus aucuparia aff.

Fabaceae

Cercis sp.

†Sophora sp.

Malvaceae

Tilia platyphyllos aff,

Ulmaceae

Ulmus sp.

†Zelkova ungeri

Berberidaceae

Berberis chinensis aff.

Moraceae

Ficus sp.

Altingiaceae

†Liquidambar europaeum

Simaroubaceae

Ailanthus altissima aff.

Angiosperms, monocots 

Smilaceae

Smilax aspera

Potamogetonaceae

Potamogeton sp.

Hydrocharitaceae

Egeria densa aff.

Najas sp.

Typhaceae

Typha sp.

Images of some extant close relatives of the fossil species

References

Pliocene
Paleobotany
Ankara Province
Fossils of Turkey